Johan Jüngling (born 1 May 1977) is a Swedish former squash player, representing Växjö SK and living in Jönköping. He represented Sweden at several European championships and world championships.

Playing for the Swedish national team for 10 years, he was ranked number-one in Sweden. He won the Swedish national championship eight times as a junior, and four times as a senior. In 2005, he won the Andalucian team championship.

References

External links
 

1977 births
Living people
Swedish male squash players
Sportspeople from Jönköping